Quincinetto is a comune (municipality) in the Metropolitan City of Turin in the Italian region Piedmont, located about  north of Turin.

Twin towns
 Marnaz, France (1996)

References

Cities and towns in Piedmont